Sunshine City may refer to:
 
 Sunshine City, Ma On Shan, a property development in Ma On Shan, New Territories, Hong Kong
 Sunshine City, Tokyo, a building complex in Ikebukuro, Tokyo
 St. Petersburg, Florida, United States, nicknamed Florida's Sunshine City
 Sunshine City (album), an album by Australian music group TV Rock
 Sunshine City (TV series), a Canadian comedy mystery television series

See also
 Sun City (disambiguation)